Hannah Ford-Welton (born June 29, 1990) is an American musician, drummer and vocalist from Louisville, Kentucky.

Hannah previously played jazz fusion in her own band as well as with the trio Pandorum. In 2010, she joined the Milwaukee-based rock band Bellevue Suite. With the latter group she released the album This Far From Sanity in 2013. She was offered a spot in Prince's backing band 3rdeyegirl with guitarist Donna Grantis and bassist Ida Kristine Nielsen in 2013.

Hannah is married to Joshua Welton,  who co-produced three Prince albums and guested with 3rdeyegirl performances on keyboard and cowbell.

Musical Education
Welton's first practical experience as a drummer was in her primary school ensemble, Louisville Leopard Percussionists.  At the age of twelve, she began playing professionally in her father's blues band in Chicago.
Welton continued her musical education with a scholarship at the Chicago College of Performing Arts, studying in the Vocal Jazz Department as well as playing in the school’s Latin Ensemble and Big Band Orchestra.

With Prince and 3rdeyegirl
Welton was recruited by Prince in September 2012 as a guest drummer for the Welcome 2 Chicago three-show residency after seeing videos of her performing online. Soon after, she appeared as lead drummer of the New Power Generation for Prince's performance of his song,  Rock And Roll Love Affair on Jimmy Kimmel Live!'s show on 23 October 2012, as well as in the official music video.
Asked by Prince to look for a female guitarist, Hannah, together with her husband Joshua, scouted online and found Donna Grantis via her videos on YouTube in late November. She auditioned one week later at Paisley Park Studios and subsequently recruited in December 2012. Bassist Ida Nielsen had been performing with The NPG since October 2010, and the only member of the trio to have previous experience playing for Prince.

3rdeyegirl were formed in December 2012 and went on to tour with Prince on his Live Out Loud Tour in 2013,  and his Hit and Run Tour from 2014-15.  They released one album, Plectrumelectrum,  in 2014. Joshua Welton would also join the tours on percussion. He co-produced Prince's next two albums, Art Official Age and Hit n Run Phase One,  and co-wrote most tracks on the latter.

Other works
After Prince's death in 2016,  Hannah and Joshua started their own Christian ministry in 2018.

Discography
With Bellevue Suite
 This Far From Sanity (2013)

With Prince and 3rdeyegirl
 Plectrumelectrum (2014)

See also
 Louisville Leopard Percussionists

References

External links
 

1990 births
American women drummers
American rock drummers
Living people
Musicians from Louisville, Kentucky
Rock musicians from Kentucky
Singers from Kentucky
New Power Generation members
Kentucky women musicians
21st-century American singers
21st-century American women singers
21st-century American drummers
3rdeyegirl members